The 1984–85 All-Ireland Senior Club Hurling Championship was the 15th staging of the All-Ireland Senior Club Hurling Championship, the Gaelic Athletic Association's premier inter-county club hurling tournament. The championship began on 30 September 1984 and ended on 24 March 1985.

Ballyhale Shamrocks from Kilkenny were the defending champions, however, they failed to qualify after being beaten by St. Martin's in the Kilkenny Championship.

On 24 March 1985, St. Martin's won the championship after a 1-13 to 1-10 defeat of Castlegar in the All-Ireland final replay at Semple Stadium. It remains their only All-Ireland title.

Tom Moran from the St. Martin's club was the championship's top scorer with 7-16.

Results

Connacht Senior Club Hurling Championship

First round

Second round

Semi-final

Final

Leinster Senior Club Hurling Championship

Preliminary round

First round

Quarter-finals

Semi-finals

Final

Munster Senior Club Hurling Championship

Quarter-finals

Semi-finals

Final

Ulster Senior Club Hurling Championship

Semi-finals

Final

All-Ireland Senior Club Hurling Championship

Quarter-final

Semi-finals

Final

Championship statistics

Top scorers

Top scorers overall

References

1984 in hurling
1985 in hurling
All-Ireland Senior Club Hurling Championship